Quin may refer to:

 Quin (name), including a list of people with the name
 Quin, colloquially, one of a set of quintuplets, a multiple birth of five individuals
 Quin (Sigilverse), a fictional planet
 Quin, County Clare, a village in County Clare, Ireland
 QUIN, quinolinic acid, a dicarboxylic acid with a pyridine backbone
 Quin House, nickname for Algonquin Club, Boston, Massachusetts

See also

 O'Quin
 Port Quin
 Quin Rose, Japanese video game development company
 Quin-Harkin
 Quinn (disambiguation)
 River Quin
 Wyndham-Quin